Shraddha Rama Srinath known Professionally as Shraddha Srinath (born 29 September 1990) is an Indian actress who predominantly appears in Tamil, Kannada and Telugu films. She debuted with the Malayalam film Kohinoor and gained wide acclaim for her role in the Kannada psychological thriller U Turn (2016) for which she won the Filmfare Award for Best Actress and also for her performances in Jersey, Urvi, Vikram Vedha, Nerkonda Paarvai and Operation Alamelamma. For the latter, she won Filmfare Critics Award for Best Actress – South award. She won the Zee Cine Awards Telugu for Best Find of the Year - Female in 2020 for her role in Jersey.

Early life and education
Shraddha was born on 29 September 1990 in the town of Udhampur, Jammu & Kashmir. Her father was an officer in the Kumaon Regiment of the Indian Army and her mother was a school teacher. Kannada is her mother tongue. She was raised all over India and lived in the towns of Suratgarh (Rajasthan), Bhopal (Madhya Pradesh), Dharchula (Uttarakhand) Belagavi (Karnataka), Silchar (Assam), and Secunderabad (Telangana). After graduating from 12th from Army School Secunderabad, she moved to Bangalore to study law at the Bangalore Institute of Legal Studies.

Career
After graduating from law school, she started working as a real estate lawyer with a Bangalore-based real estate company and then moved to a French retail company as the real estate legal advisor. However, along with her full-time corporate job, she continued to act in plays and also appeared in several advertisements.

She was called to play the second female lead in the Malayalam film called Kohinoor, directed by Vinay Govind, which released in September 2015. Her Kannada debut happened in May 2016 with U Turn which was directed by Pawan Kumar which premiered at the New York Indian Film Festival and then subsequently released in India and worldwide. Srinath received critical acclaim for this movie and received the Filmfare Award for Best Actress – Kannada.

Shraddha's 2017 releases are Urvi, directed by B. S. Pradeep Varma and Operation Alamelamma, directed by Simple Suni.  She debuted in the Tamil industry by doing a small role in Mani Ratnam's Katru Veliydai. Later she played the female lead in R. Kannan's movie Ivan Thanthiran opposite Gautham Karthik and R. J. Balaji in the lead and also in Pushkar Gayatri's movie Vikram Vedha opposite Madhavan. In Richie she paired opposite Nivin Pauly, directed by Gautham Ramachandran.

She started to get more offers in South Cinema Industry. She had appeared only in a song of The Villain, along with Shiva Rajkumar.

In 2019, her first release was her Bollywood debut with Ali Fazal in Milan Talkies,
which is directed by Tigmanshu Dhulia. After Milan Talkies, her next release of the year was her Telugu debut opposite Nani in the sports drama Jersey. The Times of India newspaper wrote that "Shraddha Srinath makes an impressive Telugu debut, as a woman who's head-over-heels in love with her husband, but is still not someone who will agree to put up with his carelessness." Her next release of the year was her Tamil movie K-13, where she is paired opposite Arulnithi. Her next release of the year was her Kannada movie Rustum, where she is paired opposite Shiva Rajkumar. Her next after Rustum was Nerkonda Paarvai, the Tamil remake of Hindi movie Pink, with Ajith. Her next release of the year was Jodi, where she is paired opposite Aadi Saikumar. In 2021 her releases were Tamil films Maara and Chakra. In 2022, her first release was Mohanlal starrer Malayalam film Aaraattu.

Upcoming projects
As of March 2020, She is filming for Godhra and Rishabh Shetty's Rudraprayaga and she also shooting for Anup Bhandari's Vikrant Rona. In Telugu she has completed shooting for Ravikanth Perepu's Krishna and His Leela.

Filmography

Awards and nominations

References

External links 
 

Indian film actresses
Actresses from Bangalore
Living people
Actresses from Jammu and Kashmir
Actresses in Tamil cinema
Actresses in Kannada cinema
Actresses in Malayalam cinema
Filmfare Awards South winners
Zee Cine Awards Telugu winners
21st-century Indian actresses
20th-century births
Actresses in Telugu cinema
Actresses in Hindi cinema
Year of birth missing (living people)